Andrei Kovalenko (born 1970) is a Russian ice hockey player.

Andrei Kovalenko may also refer to:

Andrei Kovalenko (Belarusian footballer) (born 1970), Belarusian footballer
Andrei Kovalenko (Russian footballer) (born 1972), Russian football coach and player
Andrei Kovalenko (water polo) (born 1970), Australian water polo player and coach